Frank Jonke (born January 30, 1985) is a Canadian former soccer player who played in the USL Premier Development League, Canadian Soccer League, Kakkonen, Ykkönen, Veikkausliiga, and the North American Soccer League.

Playing career
Born in Pickering, Ontario, Jonke was a product of the Toronto Lynx academy, playing for the U19 Toronto Lynx in the Dallas Cup. In his high school years he attended St. Mary's Catholic Secondary School. Was team captain his junior and senior seasons, leading the team in goals both seasons. Jonke earned a scholarship to attend Notre Dame College, finishing the season as top scorer in the American Mideast Conference with 25 goals. Earning NAIA Honorable Mention All-America Honors, being named to the All-American Mideast Conference first team, also named to the All-Region IX team. And was awarded the Newcomer of the Year by his teammates.

Jonke was transferred to the University of Louisville in 2005, during his junior year he started in 15 matches, led the team with seven goals on the season, and earned second team All-Big East honors. In his sophomore season he started in 17 games for the Cardinals, and led the team in goals scored with six goals.

On February 28, 2007 Jonke was signed by the Toronto Lynx for the 2007 PDL season, along with other Toronto Lynx academy graduates. He made his Lynx debut on May 12, 2007 against the West Michigan Edge in a 3–0 defeat at home. Unfortunately for Jonke, he was largely confined to the bench for most of the season, only appearing in 2 matches.

The following year he was transferred to the Italia Shooters for the 2008 CSL season. After scoring his first goal of the season Jonke continued his fine form by scoring 7 goals in a five consecutive matches. He also helped the Shooters achieve a 5-game undefeated streak. His performance was noticed by scouts sent by FF Jaro, and subsequently signed with the club.

He was later loaned out to Jakobstads Bollklubb, in order to gain more sufficient playing time. Jonke immediately impressed where he recorded eight goals in only four appearances. Once his loan was complete Jonke was released from his contract with Jaro. In 2009, he was signed by AC Oulu of the Ykkönen. Jonke made his debut for Oulu on April 25, 2009 where he scored the goal that tied the match 1–1 against FC Hämeenlinna. Jonke dominated the season by recording nine goals, and helped lead Oulu win promotion to the Veikkausliiga by finishing first in the standings. On September 13, 2010 he scored four goals against FC Honka.

In June 2011 he was signed by FC Inter Turku. After playing the remainder of the season with FC Inter Turku Jonke signed a contract with Veikkausliiga club FF Jaro in June 2012. In 2014, he returned to Canada to sign with FC Edmonton of the North American Soccer League. Where he suffered from a string of injuries. On October 28, 2015 he was one of the several players released from the club.

International career  
In 2008, he was called by head coach Nick Dasovic to the Canada men's national under-20 soccer team camp.

On January 18, 2013, Jonke received his first call up by the Canadian national team for friendlies against Denmark and United States He made his senior team debut on January 29 in a friendly against United States as a second half sub for Dwayne De Rosario, the game ended as a 0–0 draw.

Managerial career 
In 2018, he was the head coach for SC Toronto's male and female youth programs in the Ontario Premier Development League. In 2019, he served as a coach for Sole Soccer Camp.

Honours

AC Oulu
 Ykkönen: 2009

References

External links
University of Louisville profile
FC Inter Turku profile
FF Jaro profile

1985 births
Living people
Canadian expatriate sportspeople in the United States
Canadian expatriate soccer players
Canadian expatriate sportspeople in Finland
Canadian Soccer League (1998–present) players
Canadian soccer players
Canadian people of German descent
Expatriate footballers in Finland
Association football forwards
York Region Shooters players
Louisville Cardinals men's soccer players
Notre Dame College (Ohio) alumni
Soccer people from Ontario
AC Oulu players
FF Jaro players
FC Inter Turku players
FC Edmonton players
Veikkausliiga players
Toronto Lynx players
University of Louisville alumni
People from Pickering, Ontario
USL League Two players
Canada men's international soccer players
North American Soccer League players
Jakobstads BK players